Mount Barnston is a mountain located at Coaticook, in the regional county municipality of Coaticook, in the administrative region of Estrie, in Quebec (Canada), just north of the American border with Vermont. Its altitude is 743 meters

Geography 

The mountain is located near Lyster Lake and the hamlet of Baldwin Mills in the agricultural valley of the Coaticook River.

References 

Appalachian Mountains
Coaticook Regional County Municipality